Willy Georg Kükenthal (August 4, 1861, Weißenfels – August 20, 1922, Berlin) was a German zoologist. He was the older brother of botanist  and theologian Georg Kükenthal (1864–1955). Kükenthal specialized in the Octocorallia and on marine mammals. He edited, along with Thilo Krumbach, a landmark series of eight volumes in the Handbuch der Zoologie series which extensively reviewed and compiled the state of zoological knowledge of the time.

Life
Kükenthal was born to August Kükenthal (1826-1910) and Minna Wimmer (died 1917) and went to school at Weißenfels and Halle before joining the University of Munich where he studied mineralogy and later zoology at Jena, earning his doctorate at the latter institution in 1884 for studying lymphoid cells in annelids. He travelled around the North Sea with B. Weißenborn and joined the zoology department Jena under Ernst Haeckel in 1885. In 1886, with support from the Senckenberg Natural History Society, he participated in an expedition to Borneo and the Moluccas. He specialized in the study of Octocorallia, a taxonomic subclass that includes sea pens, sea fans and soft corals. In 1887 he obtained his habilitation, becoming a professor of phylogeny at Jena two years later. From 1898 he served as professor of comparative anatomy and zoology at the University of Breslau (Wrocław) and as director of the zoological museum which in the present day is the Museum of Natural History, University of Wrocław ("Muzeum Przyrodnicze Uniwersytetu Wrocławskiego" in Polish). In 1918 he was appointed professor of zoology at the University of Berlin as well as director of the zoological museum. In 1918-19 he was president of the German Zoological Society. 

Kükenthal also traveled to regions in the Arctic in expeditions made in 1889 and travelled again to the Moluccas and Borneo in 1893-94. He also conducted ethnographic studies. His large collection of zoological specimens is now housed at the Senckenberg Museum in Frankfurt. 

Kükenthal was principally interested in comparative anatomy and conducted embryological and comparative anatomical investigations of whales and other marine mammals. He was a supporter of Haeckel's biogenetic law. His other area of interest was the systematics of coelenterates and cnidarians. He published the Leitfaden für das Zoologische Praktikum (1898) and from 1913 he edited along with Thilo Krumbach the Handbuch der Zoologie.

He has over twenty zoological species named after him, including Calamorhabdium kuekenthali (Batjan iridescent snake), Emoia kuekenthali (Kuekenthal's emo skink), Hemirhamphodon kuekenthali (Kuekenthal's halfbeak), Parantica kuekenthali (Kuekenthal's yellow tiger), and Lysmata kuekenthali (Kuekenthal's cleaner shrimp).

Kükenthaløya, a small island located between Spitsbergen and Barentsøya is named in his honor.

Selected publications (in German)
Vergleichend-anatomische und entwickelungsgeschichtliche Untersuchungen an Walthieren. (1889).
Forschungsreise in den Molukken und in Borneo : im Auftrage der Senckenbergischen naturforschenden Gesellschaft [=Expedition to the Moluccas and Borneo, on behalf of the Senckenberg Natural History Society]. (1896).
Leitfaden für das Zoologische Praktikum  [=Manual of practical zoology]. (1898).
Australien, Ozeanien und Polarländer [=Australia, Oceania and Polar Lands]. (1902, 1910; with Wilhelm Sievers in Sievers’ Allgemeinen Länderkunde).
Pennatularia (1915).
Gorgonaria  (1919).

References

External links 
 
 

1861 births
1922 deaths
19th-century German zoologists
Academic staff of the Humboldt University of Berlin
People from Weißenfels
Academic staff of the University of Breslau
Academic staff of the University of Jena
20th-century German zoologists
Members of the Royal Society of Sciences in Uppsala